The Eastern Tatras form part of the European Tatra Mountains range in Poland and Slovakia.

The term is rarely used, with the area more commonly referred to as the High Tatras and the Belianske Tatras ranges.

See also
Western Tatras
Tatra National Park, Slovakia
Tatra National Park, Poland

References

External links

 
Mountain ranges of the Carpathians
Tatra Mountains